Judge Berry may refer to:

Albert S. Berry (1836–1908), U.S. Congressman who later served as judge of the seventeenth judicial district of Kentucky
Ellis Yarnal Berry (1902–1999), U.S. Congressman who previously served as probate court judge
James Henderson Berry (1841–1913), U.S. Senator who previously served as judge of the Arkansas Fourth Circuit Court 
Nathaniel S. Berry (1796–1894), governor of New Hampshire who previously served as a judge of the Grafton County Court of Common Pleas and of the Grafton County Probate Court 
Walter Van Rensselaer Berry (1859–1927), judge at the International Tribunal of Egypt
William A. Berry (judge) (1915–2004), justice of the Oklahoma Supreme Court who previously served as a county judge

Competition 
Mary Berry, cooking show judge on The Great British Bake Off (BBC/Channel 4) (known as The Great British Baking Show on PBS) cooking show, and The Great British Bake Off (ABC)

See also
Justice Berry (disambiguation)